Gopher Farm sandhill is a sand formation in southwestern Wayne County, Mississippi. It lies in the DeSoto National Forest and is tended by a staff of rangers. The sandy soil, largely mapped as Wadley series, harbors a population of gopher tortoises. Forested areas are dominated by longleaf pine and turkey oak.

References

Landforms of Mississippi
Geology of Mississippi
Hills of the United States
De Soto National Forest
Protected areas of Wayne County, Mississippi